Erokwanas is a minor Austronesian language of the north coast of the Bomberai Peninsula of Western New Guinea in Indonesia. Erokwanas speakers reside in the villages of Darembang and Goras in the Mbahamdandara District, Fakfak Regency.

References

South Halmahera–West New Guinea languages
Languages of western New Guinea